Beaumetz-lès-Aire is a commune in the Pas-de-Calais department in the Hauts-de-France region in northern France.

Geography
A village located 12 miles (18 km) south of Saint-Omer, at the junction of the D92, D130 and D159 roads.

Population

Sights
 The nineteenth century church of St. John.

See also
Communes of the Pas-de-Calais department

References

Communes of Pas-de-Calais